Denis Tishagin (born 4 July 1975) is a Russian skier. He competed in the Nordic combined event at the 1998 Winter Olympics.

References

1975 births
Living people
Russian male Nordic combined skiers
Olympic Nordic combined skiers of Russia
Nordic combined skiers at the 1998 Winter Olympics
Sportspeople from Perm, Russia